Extra! Extra! is a 1922 American silent adventure romance film directed by William K. Howard and starring Edna Murphy, Johnnie Walker, Herschel Mayall, Clarence Wilson, and John Steppling. The film was released by Fox Film Corporation on March 5, 1922.

Cast
Edna Murphy as Myra Rogers
Johnnie Walker as Barry Price
Herschel Mayall as Edward Fletcher
Clarence Wilson as Jim Rogers
John Steppling as Haskell
Gloria Woodthorpe as Mrs. Rogers
Theodore von Eltz as Fordney Stowe
Edward Jobson as Alvin Stowe
Edna Walker

Preservation
The film is now considered lost.

See also
List of lost films
1937 Fox vault fire

References

External links

1922 adventure films
1920s romance films
American adventure films
American romance films
1922 films
American silent feature films
American black-and-white films
Fox Film films
Lost American films
Films about journalists
1920s American films
Silent adventure films